Fortunato Franco (1937 – 10 May 2021) was an Indian international footballer who played as a half back.

Early and personal life
Franco was born in 1937 in Colvale in Goa, Portuguese India, moving to Mumbai at the age of six.

Club career
Franco played club football with Western Railways, Tata, Maharashtra and Salgaocar. He captained Maharashtra for eight seasons and won the 1964 Santosh Trophy with them. He retired before the age of 30 due to a knee injury.

International career
Franco was part of the India national team which appeared at the 1960 Olympics, although he did not appear at the tournament, and he won gold with India at the 1962 Asian Games. He also played at the Merdeka Cup in 1964 (winning silver) and 1965 (winning bronze). In total he earned 26 caps with the national team before retiring in 1965, following his debut in 1960.

Later life and death
After retiring from football in 1966, he worked for Tata Group as a senior manager in public relations, before retiring in 1999 and moving back to Goa. He died on 10 May 2021, aged 84, leaving behind a wife and two children.

Honours

India
Asian Games Gold medal: 1962
AFC Asian Cup runners-up: 1964
Merdeka Tournament runner-up: 1964; third-place: 1965

References

External links
 

1937 births
2021 deaths
Indian footballers
Association football midfielders
India international footballers
Maharashtra football team players
Salgaocar FC players
Footballers at the 1960 Summer Olympics
1964 AFC Asian Cup players
Olympic footballers of India
Asian Games gold medalists for India
Asian Games medalists in football
Medalists at the 1962 Asian Games
Footballers at the 1962 Asian Games
Mumbai Football League players
Footballers from Goa
People from North Goa district
Deaths from the COVID-19 pandemic in India